The Type 64 is a submachine gun of Chinese origin.  Designed for silent operations, the Type 64 has an integral suppressor making the weapon considerably quieter. The weapon is a magazine-fed selective-fire submachine gun using a closed-bolt, blowback action, chambered for 7.62×25mm Type 51 (A Chinese manufactured version of the 7.62×25mm Tokarev round).

This was one of the few Chinese-made small arms that were not based on any existing Soviet small arms.

History
While the Type 64 has been used in the PLA, it was eventually replaced in service by the Type 85 submachine gun. The weapon was developed together with the Type 64 suppressed pistol for special forces missions.

Some Type 64s were exported for the North Vietnamese military during the Vietnam War. It was used in the Sino-Vietnamese War in 1979 by Chinese troops.

Development
The Type 64 was designed from the beginning to be a suppressed weapon, unlike many other suppressed firearms that are simply modified versions of standard production guns.  An amalgam of many designs, the gun features the bolt of a PPS submachine gun and the trigger group of a ZB vz. 26, both of which are grafted onto the receiver of an AKS-47. The rate of fire is at 1,300 rpm.

The safety/fire selector lever is based on the Type 56 assault rifle. While standard 7.62mm Tokarev ammo can be used, it will increase the rate of having the integrated suppressor wear off. The Type 64 can use 20 or 30-round magazines.

A flip-up rear sight is available, set for ranges from 100 to 200 meters.

References

External links
Type 64 - Website showing detailed pictures of a Type 64 submachine gun.

Silenced firearms
Cold War weapons of China
7.62×25mm Tokarev submachine guns
Submachine guns of the People's Republic of China